(born  in Yokohama) is a Japanese bobsledder.

Kuroiwa competed at the 2014 Winter Olympics for Japan. He teamed with driver Hiroshi Suzuki, Shintaro Sato and Hisashi Miyazaki in the four-man event, finishing 26th.

Kuroiwa made his World Cup debut in December 2013. As of April 2014, his best finish is 19th, in a four-man event in 2012-13 at Lake Placid.

References

1993 births
Living people
Olympic bobsledders of Japan
People from Yokohama
Bobsledders at the 2014 Winter Olympics
Japanese male bobsledders